Harry J. "Cap" Ryan (died 1953) was an early professional football player for the Latrobe Athletic Association from 1895 until 1906. He was also selected to be the first captain in that team's history. He played alongside John Brallier who is considered the first openly professional football player. In 1897 he was named to the "All Western Pennsylvania Team" by The Pittsburg Times.

In 1898, he was selected by Latrobe manager David Berry to play for the Western Pennsylvania All-Stars in the very first football all-star game, against the Duquesne Country and Athletic Club. Ryan also served as advisor to Berry until 1902 when he went to Philadelphia to start the first National Football League. Ryan would play in the league for the Philadelphia Phillies that year.

References

The Man Who Started Pro Football

Players of American football from Pennsylvania
Latrobe Athletic Association players
West Virginia Mountaineers football players
1953 deaths
1898 Western Pennsylvania All-Star football players
Philadelphia Phillies (NFL) players
19th-century players of American football
19th-century births